Adam Perry (born 29 December 1969), also known by his stage name The Yin, is an English musician. He is known as the drummer of the bands A and the Bloodhound Gang, as well as the production team 'Collective'.

Biography 
Adam Perry was born in Leeds, Yorkshire, England. He spent his childhood there, before moving to Suffolk with his family at the age of 13. He has an identical twin brother, Jason, and a younger brother, Giles, both of whom are also members of "A". He was a member of the band Grand Designs, an early incarnation of "A", who played regular gigs in and around Lowestoft. In 1991, he moved to London where he shared a flat with his brother Jason, bassist Stevie Swindon and Dan Hawkins, who later went on to be in The Darkness.

'A': 1989–2005, 2008-present 

Adam Perry was a founding member of A, which formed in the late 1980s under the name Grand Designs. The band changed names to A in 1993, and found major commercial success in 2002 with the album Hi-Fi Serious. The band has continued to tour periodically since 2008.

Collective 
In 2005, he managed a songwriting and production team called "Collective". His brother Jason had teamed up with old friend and established songwriter Julian Emery, as well as A bassist, Daniel P Carter. Their first project was co-writing and producing the debut album from Matt Willis, Don't Let It Go to Waste. The album reached gold status and spawned three top 40 singles in the UK Singles Chart.

The team's next project was with McFly on their third album, Motion in the Ocean. The album was a success reaching the top 10 in the UK Albums Chart and spawning three UK number 1 singles. The team have also been involved with a string of writing sessions with Sugababes, Andrea Corr and Cher.

Bloodhound Gang 

In 2005, he became the new drummer for Bloodhound Gang. He replaced Willie the New Guy, who left the band in late 2005 for undisclosed reasons. He would be joined in 2009 by former A bassist Daniel P. Carter. The Bloodhound Gang disbanded in 2015.

References

External links 
 A's official site (offline)
 
 Bloodhound Gang's official site
 

1969 births
Living people
British identical twins
Musicians from Leeds
English rock drummers
British male drummers
Rap rock musicians
English expatriates in the United States
Bloodhound Gang members